Gilles Fortin (February 8, 1946 – December 4, 2021) is a Canadian politician. Fortin represented the riding of Marguerite-Bourgeoys in the National Assembly of Quebec from 1984 to 1989. Fortin was born in Montreal, Quebec.

External links
 

1946 births
French Quebecers
Living people
Politicians from Montreal
Quebec Liberal Party MNAs